Ulrike Gottschalck (born 8 November 1955) is a German politician who served as a member of the Bundestag from 2009 to 2017. Born in Sondershausen, she completed secondary school in 1970, and after training in information technology, she became an IT consultant from 1984 to 1996. She is married and has three children.
 
Gottschalck was first active politically with the Social Democratic Party of Germany (SPD) upon joining the party in 1974. From 1999 to 2005, she served as a parliamentary manager for SPD, and in 2005 she was elected to the state parliament of Hesse. After serving for four years, she was elected in 2009 to the Bundestag with 38% of the vote in the Kassel constituency, after originally being a last-second replacement for another SPD candidate who withdrew. During her first term, she served on the Committee for Transport, Building and Urban Development.

Gottschalck was re-elected in 2013 with 40% of the vote. During her time in the Bundestag, she served as a member of the Budget Committee, and a deputy member of the Committee on Family, Seniors, Women and Youth. Gottschalck chose not to seek a third term, and retired at the end of the 18th Bundestag.

References

1955 births
Living people
Female members of the Bundestag
21st-century German women politicians
Members of the Bundestag 2013–2017
Members of the Bundestag 2009–2013
Members of the Bundestag for the Social Democratic Party of Germany